Love Clinic (lit. "The Taste of Love") is a 2015 South Korean romantic comedy film directed by Aaron Kim, starring Oh Ji-ho and Kang Ye-won.

Plot
Wang Seong-ki is a male obstetrician/gynecologist and Gil Sin-seol is a female urologist. Handsome Seong-ki is loved by all his female patients, but he secretly struggles with impotence after he fails to deliver a baby via Caesarean section. Meanwhile, the equally attractive Sin-seol is an expert on men's bodies, but is actually a virgin with an abysmal dating history. When Seong-ki opens his clinic on the same floor in the same building as Sin-seol's clinic, the two romantically challenged doctors begin to constantly bump into each other and bicker.

Cast
Oh Ji-ho as Wang Seong-ki
Kang Ye-won as Gil Sin-seol
Ha Joo-hee as Maeng In-young
Kim Min-kyo as Photographer
Hong Seok-cheon as Psychiatrist
Kim Chang-ryul as Man on blind date
Oh Min-suk as Owner of foreign car
Hong Yi-joo as Ahn Gong-joo
Lee Hyo-jung as Sin-seol's father
Hong Yeo-jin as Sin-seol's mother
Han Seong-sik as Kim Young-chul
 Ji Yoon-ho as Ahn Gong-joo's high school student

Reception
Love Clinic was released on May 7, 2015, and opened in fourth place at the South Korean box office. By its third week, it has grossed  from 204,000 admissions.

References

External links

2015 romantic comedy films
South Korean romantic comedy films
Showbox films
2010s South Korean films